Theresa Celeste Conn is an American actress. She is known for her roles as Katie Peretti on As the World Turns, Christine “Aubrey Wentworth" Karr on One Life to Live, and Ashley Dupree on Breaker High.  On July 1, 2011, she married her former As the World Turns co-star, Austin Peck. On December 22, 2018, Conn joined the shopping network QVC as a program host.

Personal background 
Conn was born in Bloomington, Indiana. She is the only child of a retired U.S. Air Force officer father and a real estate agent mother. She was married to actor and musician Arthur Colombino from 2001 to 2010, with whom she has a daughter Julia Catherine Colombino. Julia was born on-air, during an episode of the TLC series, A Baby Story, which aired September 15, 2004. 

In June 2010, Conn and her former As the World Turns co-star, Austin Peck officially came out as a couple at the 37th Annual Daytime Emmy Awards. Their relationship was covered in the February 15, 2011 and March 8, 2011 issues of Soap Opera Digest magazine. The February Valentine's Day issue included an interview with Peck, covering his move to One Life to Live, along with his relationship with Conn. The couple were married on July 1, 2011. The couple have two daughters Keira Grace Peck and Morgan Theresa Peck.

Professional background 
Conn starred in the 2008 movie, iMurders, in the role of Sandra Wilson. She also appeared on the Canadian teen show Breaker High.

From 1998 to its finale in 2010, Conn portrayed Katie Snyder on CBS' As the World Turns. In December 2010, she joined One Life to Live in the newly created role of Aubrey Wentworth, credited under her maiden name, Terri Conn, due to the split from her husband, Arthur Colombino.

Honors and awards 
In 2001, Conn received a Daytime Emmy Award nomination in the category of Outstanding Younger Actress. She was additionally honored for the same role by Soap Opera Digest.

Filmography

Film

Television

See also 
 Supercouple

References

External links 

American film actresses
American television actresses
Actresses from Indiana
Living people
People from Bloomington, Indiana
20th-century American actresses
21st-century American actresses
Year of birth missing (living people)